Elias Slothower (born October 17, 1815) was an American farmer and politician.

Slothower was born in Adams County, Pennsylvania in 1815. Upon becoming and adult, he moved to Indianapolis, Chicago, and Madison, Wisconsin before finally settling near Monroe in Lafayette County, Wisconsin. He purchased a farm in the Town of Gratiot.

He was elected to the first Wisconsin State Assembly as a Democrat, serving in 1848. He also served as assessor and a member of Town of Gratiot board of supervisors.

He married Susanna E. Zeigle in 1836, with whom he had eight children.

References

1815 births
Democratic Party members of the Wisconsin State Assembly
People from Adams County, Pennsylvania
People from Gratiot, Wisconsin
Year of death missing